Michael Carlyle Hall (born February 1, 1971) is an American actor and singer best known for his roles as Dexter Morgan, the titular character in the Showtime series Dexter, and David Fisher in the HBO drama series Six Feet Under. These two roles collectively earned Hall a Golden Globe Award and three Screen Actors Guild Awards. He has also acted in Broadway shows and narrated audiobooks.

Born and raised in Raleigh, North Carolina, Hall graduated from New York University's graduate acting program at the Tisch School of the Arts in 1996. He began his acting career on Broadway in the revival of Cabaret and appeared in a variety of shows in the mid- to late 1990s. Aside from his acclaimed roles on Six Feet Under and Dexter, he starred in the Broadway musical Hedwig and The Angry Inch from 2014 to 2015. He has also starred in films including Paycheck (2003), Gamer (2009), Mark Felt: The Man Who Brought Down the White House (2017), Game Night (2018), and In the Shadow of the Moon (2019). In 2021, he reprised his role of Dexter Morgan for the miniseries revival Dexter: New Blood.

Early life 
Hall was born in Raleigh, North Carolina. His mother, Janice (née Styons) Hall, is a mental health counselor at Lees-McRae College, and his father, William Carlyle Hall, a systems engineer manager for IBM. Hall had one older sister who died in infancy before his birth. His father died of prostate cancer in 1982 at the age of 39 when Hall was 11 years old. He has said of this, "There was a very one-on-one, immediate family relationship, my mom and I." In a 2004 interview, Hall spoke about his experience in the wake of his father's death: "Certainly, for a young boy, there's no good age, but I think I was on the cusp of a time in my life where I was starting to reach puberty, to relate to my father. To have him ... something gets frozen. As you revisit it for the rest of your life, it's sort of this slow—but hopefully sure—crawling out of that frozen moment."

Hall graduated from Ravenscroft School in Raleigh in 1989, and from Earlham College, a liberal arts college in Richmond, Indiana, in 1993. While he has said that he had planned to become a lawyer, he later acknowledged that he had never formed a serious intent to go to law school. Hall graduated from New York University's graduate acting program at the Tisch School of the Arts in 1996.

Hall discovered acting early in life: he performed in What Love Is when he was in second grade at Ravenscroft School. In fifth grade, he began singing, first in a boys' choir, and later, in high school, in musicals, performing in standards such as The Sound of Music, Oklahoma!, and Fiddler on the Roof. While a student at Earlham College, he continued acting, starring in Cabaret and other productions.

Career

1995–2005: Early stage roles and Six Feet Under 
Hall's professional acting career began in the theater. Off-Broadway, he appeared in Macbeth and Cymbeline at the New York Shakespeare Festival; in Timon of Athens and Henry V at The Public Theater; The English Teachers at the Manhattan Class Company (MCC); and the controversial play Corpus Christi at the Manhattan Theatre Club. He also performed the role of Paris Singer in the workshop production of a Sondheim musical (titled Wise Guys at the time, and in later versions, Bounce and then Road Show. His character's songs and function were transferred to the character Hollis Bessamer in the final version.) In Los Angeles, Hall appeared in Skylight at the Mark Taper Forum. As part of the Texas Shakespeare Festival in the summer of 1995, he played Lancelot in Camelot, Lysander in A Midsummer Night's Dream, and Claudio in Much Ado About Nothing.

In 1998, Hall performed in William Shakespeare's Cymbeline, in the role of Posthumus, which ran from August 4 to 30. In 1999, director Sam Mendes cast Hall as the flamboyant Emcee in the revival of Cabaret; this was Hall's first Broadway role. Mendes suggested Hall for the role of closeted David Fisher, when Alan Ball began casting the TV drama Six Feet Under. "Everything opened up for me in Cabaret," but, Hall reported in a 2004 interview, "It slammed shut for David."

Hall's work in the first season of Six Feet Under was recognized with a nomination for an Emmy Award for Outstanding Lead Actor in a Drama Series and for an AFI Award nomination for Actor of the Year in 2002. In addition, he shared in the Screen Actors Guild nominations for Outstanding Performance by an Ensemble in a Drama Series all five years that the show was in production, winning the award in 2003 and 2004.

In 2003, Hall toured as Billy Flynn in the musical Chicago. In 2005, he returned to off-Broadway theater in the premiere of Noah Haidle's Mr. Marmalade, playing the title character, an emotionally disturbed little girl's imaginary friend.

2006–2014: Television focus and Dexter 

Hall starred in and co-produced the Showtime television series Dexter, in which he played a psychopathic blood-spatter analyst for the Miami Metro Police Department, who moonlights as a serial killer/vigilante. Jennifer Carpenter played his adoptive sister, Debra Morgan. The series premiered on October 1, 2006, and ended its run in 2013. After months of rumors, on April 18, 2013, Showtime announced via social media that season eight would be Dexters final season.  Hall also voiced Dexter Morgan in the animated web series Dexter: Early Cuts.

For his work on Dexter, Hall was nominated for five Emmy Awards for Outstanding Lead Actor in a Drama Series from 2008 to 2012. The show itself was also nominated for Emmy citations in the Drama Series category in the same years. He won the 2007 Television Critics Association award for Individual Achievement in Drama. Hall was nominated for the Golden Globe Award for Best Performance by an Actor in a TV Drama in 2007, 2008, and again in 2010. Also in 2010, he won a Screen Actors Guild Award for Outstanding Performance by a Male Actor in a Drama Series.

In 2014, Hall stated he would be open to returning for a spinoff series, but said: "I can't even wrap my mind around that. And it's all just theoretical until there is some sort of script reflecting somebody's idea of where it could possibly go. But it's hard for me to imagine what that would be. Yeah, as far as playing Dexter again for an undefined amount of time, that's a little daunting to consider. But doing another television series—there's a lot of amazing stuff on TV. I don't want to do that right away. But I wouldn't say never to that." He has said he would consider revisiting his role as the serial killer if something was written that he deemed "worth pursuing".

Hall's film credits include the thriller Paycheck (2003), the science fiction thriller Gamer (2009), the 2011 drama The Trouble with Bliss (2011), the comedy Peep World (2012), and Kill Your Darlings (2013). Hall performed in a film adaptation of Joe R. Lansdale's cult novel Cold in July, directed by Jim Mickle. The film premiered at the 2014 Sundance Film Festival in Park City, Utah. Hall will portray Abraham Lincoln's advisor, Leonard Swett, in the documentary film The Gettysburg Address.

In 2014, he returned to Broadway in the play The Realistic Joneses, starring in the role of John Jones. He assumed the title role in Hedwig and The Angry Inch on Broadway on October 16, 2014, and performed the role until January 18, 2015. Hall returned to the role of Hedwig from February 17–21, 2015, to replace John Cameron Mitchell, who had a knee injury.

2015–present: Dexter revival and other ventures 
At the end of 2015 and the start of 2016, Hall starred as Thomas Newton in the NYTW stage production of Lazarus, created by David Bowie and Enda Walsh. Hall performed the song "Lazarus", which appeared on Bowie's final album, Blackstar (2016), on The Late Show with Stephen Colbert in December 2015. He later appeared in the London production from October 25, 2016, until January 22, 2017.

On January 16, 2014, Showtime President David Nevins said there had been discussions for a Dexter spinoff series that would take the character in a different direction and not continue the previous series. Nevins said they would only do the show if Hall agreed to return. On October 14, 2020, Showtime confirmed that Hall would reprise his role of Dexter Morgan in a 10-episode limited series, with Clyde Phillips returning as showrunner. The series premiered on November 7, 2021 and ended on January 9, 2022. The series finale was the most watched finale in the history of the network, it also set streaming records as well.

In 2017, Hall played John F. Kennedy in season two, episode eight of the Netflix historical drama The Crown, alongside actress Jodi Balfour as Jackie Kennedy. He also starred as Tom Delaney, British widower and doctor, in Safe, an eight-part Netflix original crime drama which premiered on May 10, 2018. In 2018, Hall starred as Thom Pain in the off-Broadway production of Thom Pain (based on nothing), a one-man show written by Will Eno. The show was directed by Oliver Butler for the Signature Theatre in New York City, and it ran from October 23, 2018, to December 9, 2018, after being extended twice.

On February 3, 2019, Hall starred as a fictionalized version of himself in the half-hour-long, one-time-only Broadway musical, Skittles Commercial: The Broadway Musical. Also in 2019, Hall starred as Holt in the Netflix thriller film In the Shadow of the Moon. Hall voices the character Toffee in Daron Nefcy's Star vs. the Forces of Evil and also voiced Batman in Justice League: Gods and Monsters.

In 2018, Hall narrated the audiobook version of Stephen King's horror novel Pet Sematary. In 2019, Hall starred alongside Martha Plimpton and Hamish Linklater in an episode of the theatre podcast Playing on Air, titled "Nudity Rider". Hall has sung for the band Princess Goes to the Butterfly Museum since 2018, alongside Matt Katz-Bohen and Peter Yanowitz. On September 3, 2019, they filmed their first music video for their song, "Ketamine", in Tarrytown, New York. The audio for the song was released October 25, 2019, with the official music video premiering on Collider on December 12, 2019. The band's eponymous debut EP was released on April 2, 2020.

Personal life 
In 2002, Hall married actress Amy Spanger. The summer after their wedding, Hall played Billy Flynn opposite Spanger's Roxie Hart in the Broadway musical Chicago. The pair divorced in 2006.

In 2007, Hall began dating his Dexter co-star Jennifer Carpenter. They eloped on New Year's Eve 2008 in California and publicly appeared together for the first time as a married couple at the 66th Golden Globe Awards in January 2009. In December 2010, Hall and Carpenter released a statement announcing that they had filed for divorce after having been separated "for some time". The divorce was granted for irreconcilable differences and finalized in December 2011; however, the two remain close friends.

In September 2012, Hall began dating Morgan Macgregor, who was an associate editor at the Los Angeles Review of Books, and they married on February 29, 2016.

Cancer 
On January 13, 2010, Hall's agent and spokesman confirmed that Hall was undergoing treatment for a form of Hodgkin's lymphoma. In an interview, Hall said that it was upsetting to learn of his cancer when he was 38 years old, as his father had died from cancer at age 39. Hall accepted his Golden Globe and Screen Actors Guild Award in 2010 while wearing a knitted cap over his bald head, having lost his hair due to chemotherapy. Hall wore a wig for season 5 of Dexter to cover up his hair loss due to chemotherapy. On April 25, 2010, Carpenter announced that Hall's cancer was fully in remission and he was set to get back to work for a new season of Dexter.

Charity 
Hall is the face of the Somalia Aid Society's "Feed The People" campaign. He has also worked with Kiehl's to promote a limited-edition skin care line that benefits the Waterkeeper Alliance, an environmental nonprofit organization that works toward clean and safe water worldwide.

In 2011, Hall was the celebrity spokesperson for the Leukemia & Lymphoma Society's "Light the Night Walk" fundraising campaign.

Filmography

Film

Television

Theater

Awards and nominations

See also 
 List of select cases of Hodgkin's Disease

References

External links 

 
 
 
 

1971 births
Living people
20th-century American male actors
21st-century American male actors
Male actors from North Carolina
American male film actors
American male stage actors
American male television actors
Earlham College alumni
Best Drama Actor Golden Globe (television) winners
Outstanding Performance by a Male Actor in a Drama Series Screen Actors Guild Award winners
Actors from Raleigh, North Carolina
Tisch School of the Arts alumni
American male Shakespearean actors
Ravenscroft School alumni
Audiobook narrators